Leuctra fusca is a species of insect belonging to the family Leuctridae.

It is native to Eurasia.

References

Plecoptera